RPK-6 Vodopad ("waterfall") is a Soviet 533 mm anti-submarine missile deployed operationally since 1981.

RPK-7 Veter ("wind") is a 650 mm version, deployed operationally since 1984.

Both missiles are given the same United States Navy designation SS-N-16 and NATO designation Stallion.

Both missiles are torpedo-tube launched, with a solid-fuel rocket engine to power them above the surface. Both missiles are dual-role; they can be armed with either a 400 mm anti-submarine torpedo or a nuclear depth charge.

The Veter's increased range of approximately 100 kilometers was an impressive boost over its predecessor the SS-N-15 Starfish, which could only reach half the distance.

Specifications (RPK-7 Veter)
Performance:
 Range: 100 km (55 nmi) 
Payload:
 Nuclear depth charge or 400 mm torpedo
Guidance:
inertial guidance

Operators 

Soviet Navy

Russian Navy

References

External links

Cold War anti-ship missiles of the Soviet Union
Anti-submarine missiles
RPK-006
RPK-007
Surface-to-surface missiles
Military equipment introduced in the 1980s